The Irish Premier League in season 2003–04 comprised 16 teams, and Linfield won the championship.

League standings

Results
Each team played every other team twice (home and away) for a total of 30 games.

Promotion/relegation play-off
Cliftonville, the club that finished in the relegation play-off place, faced Armagh City, the runners-up of the 2003-04 Intermediate League First Division in a two-legged tie for a place in next season's Irish Premier League.

Cliftonville won 4–1 on aggregate

References
Northern Ireland - List of final tables (RSSSF)

NIFL Premiership seasons
1
Northern